The 1994 Commonwealth Games (French: XVéme Jeux du Commonwealth) were held in Victoria, British Columbia, from 18 to 28 August 1994. Ten types of sports were featured at the Victoria Games: athletics, aquatics, badminton, boxing, cycling, gymnastics, lawn bowls, shooting, weightlifting, and wrestling.

Host selection
Three bids for the 1994 Commonwealth Games were submitted. Victoria, New Delhi, and Cardiff were the bidding cities. On 15 September 1988, the Commonwealth Games Federation voted to award Victoria the 1994 Commonwealth Games.

Venues 

 University of Victoria – Athletes' Village
 Centennial Stadium – Athletics
 McKinnon Gym – Badminton
 Victoria Memorial Arena – Gymnastics
 Royal Athletic Park – Field Lacrosse (demonstration)
 Royal Theatre – Weightlifting
 Heal's Range – Shooting
 Saanich Commonwealth Place – Aquatics
 Juan de Fuca Recreation Centre – Cycling, Lawn bowls, Wrestling
 Archie Browning Sports Centre (Esquimalt) – Boxing

Final "Original Games" 
The 1994 games was the last time team sports were excluded. In 1991, the Commonwealth Games Federation deemed the original setup of ten sports to be obsolete. Beginning with the 1998 games, team sports such as Rugby sevens, Basketball, and Field hockey were added. The decision was taken to encourage more revenue streams from television by making the games more attractive to viewing audiences.

Opening ceremony 
A simple friendly atmosphere was the theme to the Opening Ceremonies. In the presence of Prince Edward, the Athletes had a long march past to their seated area (an idea created four years previously and emulated since at the 2014 Games in Glasgow). Welcome speeches and flag raisings were followed by a precision horse riding display by the Royal Canadian Mounted Police. A visual and theatrical display by the Four Nations Tribes culminated in a massive Thunderbird symbol covering the entire inner field. This was followed by a flypast by the Snowbirds Canadian Forces aerobatic display team.

Games

Participating teams
There were 63 participating nations at the 1994 Commonwealth Games. The XV Commonwealth Games marked South Africa's return to the Commonwealth Games following the apartheid era, and over 30 years since the country last competed in the Games in 1958. Namibia participated in its first Games after gaining independence from South Africa in 1990, and the Caribbean island of Montserrat also made their Games debut. This was Hong Kong's last appearance at the Games before the transfer of sovereignty from Britain to China.

Sports
There were events in 14 disciplines across 10 sports for the 1994 Commonwealth Games.

 Aquatics
 
 
 
 
 
 
 Cycling
  Road (4)
  Track (9)
 Gymnastics
  Artistic gymnastics (14)
  Rhythmic gymnastics (6)

Calendar
The following table shows a summary of the competition schedule.

Medal table
This is a full table of the medal count of the 1994 Commonwealth Games. These rankings sort by the number of gold medals earned by a country. The number of silvers is taken into consideration next and then the number of bronze. If, after the above, countries are still tied, equal ranking is given and they are listed alphabetically. This follows the system used by the IOC, IAAF and BBC.

This was the first time since the commencement of the British Empire Games (in 1930) that England did not achieve a medal ranking in the top two.

Medals by event

Aquatics

Athletics

Badminton

Bowls

Boxing

Cycling

Track

Road

Gymnastics

Artistic

Rhythmic

Shooting

Pistol

Rifle

Shotgun

Weightlifting

Wrestling

Marketing

Mascot
The official mascot of the Games was an anthropomorphic killer whale named "Klee Wyck". This nickname, meaning "the laughing one", was given to Canadian painter and sculptor Emily Carr by the Yuułuʔiłʔatḥ Nation.

Boxing committee
In preparation for 1994 Commonwealth Games, a boxing committee was formed in 1989. The chairperson of the boxing committee was Hassan Sunderani, and the initial members were Brian Zelley, Glyn Jones and Mike Sartori.

In the initial stages, of the committee one of the immediate tasks was to prepare a guide as to what was expected at the Games, and to document some history of amateur boxing in the Greater Victoria area. The primary work was done by chairperson Sunderani while the local boxing history was assigned to committee member Zelley, a previous news editor for the British Columbia Amateur Boxing Association in the mid-1980s and a contributor of boxing news to various news outlets in the 1970s and 80s.

The next order of business was to start the process of organising volunteers. The first formal public meeting to begin this process took place in Victoria in the boardroom of the Victoria Commonwealth Games Society on 21 April 1990. The meeting included three of the committee members, a VCHS official, and seven potential volunteers including two former Vancouver Island Amateur Boxing commissioners – Bert Wilkinson and Rick Brough.

The primary decision was to arrange a bigger meeting and consider reviving the Greater Victoria Amateur Boxing Association on a formal or informal basis, and to have former experienced people with some background in the sport of amateur boxing. That meeting took place on 13 May 1990 with 23 persons in attendance and was listed as the "Greater Victoria Amateur Boxing Association Founding Meeting". This would become an important meeting to begin the real work in preparation of volunteers, have a representative attend the 1990 Seattle Goodwill Games to observe, and plan and prepare for a test event in 1993. Preliminary coverage of the 13 May meeting included a piece titled "Approaching Games to lift amateur boxing's profile". The reporter Jeff Rud interviewed Games official John Stothart and boxing committee members Mike Sartori and Brian Zelley.

The 1993 test event was held in August and included some top Canadian boxers such as Dale Brown of Calgary. Brown was highlighted in the local paper with the headlines "Brown building impressive ring career"; at the end of the tournament the local Times-Colonist newspaper reported "Tournament was a perfect dry run".

Interim boxing chairman
During 1991 Hassan Sunderani resigned as the chairman and committee member Brian Zelley stepped-in for a one-year period as the acting chairman of the committee. During this period, the primary role was to attend Sports Committee meetings while the local boxing community started to organise for potential boxing club activity. In 1992, Sunderani resumed his position and steps were taken to prepare for the pre-Commonwealth Games event in 1993. Also, some new members were appointed to the boxing committee such as Tom Black.

See also 
 Knowledge Totem Pole
 Victoria bid for the 2022 Commonwealth Games

References

 21 April 1990, Minutes of a Meeting of Victoria Boxing Enthusiasts
 13 May 1990, Minutes of Greater Victoria Amateur Boxing Association Founding Meeting

External links
 Commonwealth Games Official Site
 1994 Commonwealth Games Legacy Fund website

 
Sports competitions in Victoria, British Columbia
International sports competitions hosted by Canada
Commonwealth Games in Canada
Commonwealth Games by year
Fictional orcas
Commonwealth Games
Commonwealth Games
Commonwealth
August 1994 sports events in Canada
Sports competitions in British Columbia
20th century in Victoria, British Columbia